The Republican Era, 1869–1901 is a book by Leonard D. White and Jean Schneider. It  won the 1959 Pulitzer Prize for History.

References 

Pulitzer Prize for History-winning works